This is a round-up of the 1979 Sligo Intermediate Football Championship. This was the inaugural staging of the Championship, following the restructuring of the previous year, and it meant that a number of strong clubs were in contention. Shamrock Gaels were perceived as the strongest of all, and they confirmed this by winning the title after a comfortable win over neighbours Owenmore Gaels in the final.

Quarter finals

Semi-finals

Sligo Intermediate Football Championship Final

Sligo Intermediate Football Championship
Sligo Intermediate Football Championship